The 1970 Copa Argentina Finals were the final two-legged tie that decided the champion of the 1970 Copa Argentina. The finals were contested in two-legged home-and-away format between San Lorenzo and Vélez Sársfield. The first leg was played in Atlanta Stadium of Villa Crespo, finishing in a 2-2 tie. 

The second leg was never played so the tournament was unfinished and neither San Lorenzo nor Velez Sarsfield were declared champion. The champion was supposed to qualify to Copa Ganadores de Copa but this never happened

Qualified teams

Road to the final

Match details

First leg

Second leg

As the second leg was never played, no team was awarded the title.

References

Copa Argentina
1970 in Argentine football
a
a
Football in Buenos Aires